Lac d'Izourt is a lake in Ariège, France. At an elevation of 1645 m, its surface area is 0.33 km².

Lakes of Ariège (department)